Edmond Kossivi Apéti nicknamed Docteur Kaolo, was an international Togolese football player.

During his time with Étoile Filante, he reached the final of the African Cup of Champions Clubs in 1968. He played in the 1972 African Cup of Nations, scoring twice against Mali in their opening game and once more against Kenya. He died in a motorcycle collision in July 1972.

A tournament was held in his name during August 2014.

References 

1972 deaths
Togolese footballers
Togo international footballers
1972 African Cup of Nations players
Road incident deaths in Togo
Association footballers not categorized by position
Year of birth missing